KHIZ-LD, virtual channel 39 (VHF digital channel 2), is a low-powered BeIN Sports Xtra-affiliated television station licensed to Los Angeles, California, United States. The station’s transmitter is located atop Mount Wilson, California.

History 
Signing on as K64AT, the station was originally licensed to Victorville, California, and was owned by the Trinity Broadcasting Network and broadcast programming from TBN as a translator of KTBN-TV for many years on UHF channel 64. K64AT moved to channel 33 in 1987 and took on the call sign of K33BT. It later moved to channel 39 in 2003, with the call sign K39GY.

In 2007, TBN sold the station to Jeff Chang, a former California television weatherman and owner of several low-powered television stations (including sister station K33DK, now KVVB-LD in Lucerne Valley).

On March 22, 2007, the station received a construction permit to flash-cut operations to digital television. Upon completion, it began broadcast at an effective radiated power of 15,000 watts.

On May 6, 2009, the station was switched to an analog translator of KHIZ-DT (channel 44) in Barstow. It also airs English and Cantonese programming.

On July 19, 2012, the station moved to channel 2 and changed its call sign to K02RB-D and switched to a digital translator of KOCE-TV 50, a PBS member station in Huntington Beach in Orange County, California. KOCE now rebroadcasts its signal via over-air translator K41CB for the Victorville/Barstow area.

In 2013, K02RB-D, KILM and KVVB-LD are regular broadcasting stations based in the High Desert, which used to have KHIZ-TV known for local newscasts and independent commercial station programming.

On January 22, 2014, the station changed its call sign to the current KHIZ-LD and switched to an affiliate of Zuus Country (now The Country Network).

Sale to DTV America and more subchannels 
On August 24, 2015, the station was sold to Sunrise, Florida-based low-power TV station owner DTV America Corporation. It was approved by the FCC on October 5.

In 2016, the simulcast of the KFLA-LD2 feed of The Country Network was moved to KHIZ-LD3. The main subchannel changed to Newsmax TV, and infomercials on the second subchannel. The 24-hour subchannel version of Sinclair Broadcasting’s American Sports Network became available on KHIZ-LD4, and the Liquidation Channel, and the west coast feed of QVC was launched on the fifth and sixth subchannels, respectively.

Subchannels
The station’s digital signal is multiplexed:

References

External links
DTV America

 

Ion Mystery affiliates
Innovate Corp.
HIZ-LD
Television channels and stations established in 1987
Low-power television stations in the United States
Victorville, California
1987 establishments in California
Classic Reruns TV affiliates